The 2019 Spanish Open is the third event of the 2019 ITTF Challenge Series. It took place from 22–24 March in Guadalajara, Spain.

Men's singles

Seeds

Draw

Top half

Section 1

Section 2

Bottom half

Section 3

Section 4

Finals

Women's singles

Seeds

Draw

Top half

Section 1

Section 2

Bottom half

Section 3

Section 4

Finals

Men's doubles

Seeds

Draw

Women's doubles

Seeds

Draw

References

External links
 Tournament page on ITTF website

Spanish Open
International sports competitions hosted by Spain
Spanish Open (table tennis)
Spanish Open